Gheorghe Aurelian Leahu (born 30 September 1968) is a Romanian former footballer who played as a defender and midfielder.

Honours
Petrolul Ploiești
Cupa României: 1994–95

References

1968 births
Living people
Romanian footballers
Association football defenders
Liga I players
Liga II players
CSM Flacăra Moreni players
FC Argeș Pitești players
FC Petrolul Ploiești players
ACF Gloria Bistrița players
FC Astra Giurgiu players
People from Fieni